John Denvir (born John William Denvir) is a former professional American football guard. He played for the Denver Broncos of the American Football League during the 1962 AFL season.

References

People from Connellsville, Pennsylvania
Denver Broncos (AFL) players
American football offensive guards
West Virginia Mountaineers football players
Colorado Buffaloes football players
Players of American football from Pennsylvania

1938 births

Living people